This is a list of members of the National Italian American Sports Hall of Fame.


A

Ed Abbaticchio, baseball player
Ben Abruzzo, balloonist
Acerra's, basketball players
Mike Adamle, gridiron football
Joey Amalfitano, baseball player
Joe Amato, dragster racer
Lou Ambers, boxer
Alan Ameche, football player
John Andretti, race car driver
Mario Andretti, race car driver
Michael Andretti, race car driver
Sammy Angott, boxer
Johnny Antonelli, baseball player
Vito Antuofermo, boxer
Eddie Arcaro, jockey
Bob Aspromonte, baseball player
Ken Aspromonte, baseball player
Charles Atlas, bodybuilder
Geno Auriemma, basketball coach

B

Sal Bando, baseball player
Ray Barbuti, middle-distance runner
Tom Barrasso, hockey player
Carmen Basilio, boxer
Bat Battalino, boxer
Mark Bavaro, football player
Gary Beban, football quarterback
Joe Bellino, football halfback
Nino Benvenuti, boxing
John Beradino, baseball player and actor
Yogi Berra, baseball player
Angelo Bertelli, football quarterback
Dan Biasone, basketball executive
Craig Biggio, baseball
Matt Biondi, swimmer
Ping Bodie, baseball player
Brian Boitano, figure skater
Nick Bollettieri, tennis coach
Zeke Bonura, baseball player and thrower
Mollie Ann Bracigliano, sports marketing
Ralph Branca, baseball pitcher
Lawrence Brignolia, marathon runner
Gene Brito, football player
Doug Bruno, basketball
Tedy Bruschi, football player
Doug Buffone, football player
Nick Buoniconti, football player

C

John Calipari, basketball coach
Dolph Camilli, baseball player
Roy Campanella, baseball player
Lou Campi,professional Bowler
Tony Canadeo, football player
Tony Canzoneri, boxer
Donna Caponi, LPGA golfer
Gino Cappelletti, football player
John Cappelletti, football player
Jennifer Capriati, tennis player
Gina Carano, MMA fighter
Glenn Carano, football player
Harry Caray, baseball commentator
Frankie Carideo, football player
Mary Carillo, tennis player
Primo Carnera, boxer and wrestler
Lou Carnesecca, basketball coach
John Carpino, baseball executive
Rick Casares, football player
Santo Catanzaro, softball player
Phil Cavarretta, baseball player
Al Cervi, basketball player and coach
Giorgio Chinaglia, soccer player
Dino Ciccarelli, hockey player
Jean Cione, women's baseball player
Jerry Colangelo, basketball executive
Rocky Colavito, baseball player
Ned Colletti, baseball executive
Frank Coltiletti, jockey
Franco Columbu, bodybuilder
Rocco B. Commisso, soccer player
Tony Conigliaro, Major League Baseball Player
John Conti, football player
Young Corbett III, boxer
Jim Corno, broadcasting executive
Fred Couples, golfer
Jim Covert, football player
Frank Crosetti, baseball shortstop
Tony Cuccinello, baseball player
Pete Cutino, water polo coach
Bobby Czyz, boxer

D

Constantine "Cus" D'Amato, boxing trainer
Eddie DeBartolo, football owner
Michael DeCicco, fencing coach 
Alexis DeJoria, racecar driver
Vinny Del Negro, basketball coach
Alex Delvecchio, hockey player
Tony DeMarco, boxer
Frank Demaree, baseball player
Joe DeNucci, boxer
Ralph DePalma, racecar driver
Peter DePaolo, racecar driver
Red DiBernardi, basketball player
Buttercup Dickerson, first Italian in MLB
Ernie DiGregorio, basketball player
Dom DiMaggio, Major League baseball player
Joe DiMaggio, Major League baseball player
Vince DiMaggio, Major League baseball player
Angelo Dundee, boxing cornerman
Johnny Dundee, boxer
Lou Duva, boxing trainer

E

Mike Eruzione, hockey player
Phil Esposito, hockey player
Tony Esposito, hockey player

F

Alfred Faragalli, bowler
Dave Ferraro, bowler
Buzz Fazio, bowler
Vince Ferragamo, football quarterback
Lou Ferrigno, bodybuilder
Doug Ford, golfer
Chet Forte, talk radio host
Joe Fortunato, football player
John Franco, baseball reliever
Mike Fratello, basketball coach
Linda Fratianne, figure skater
Jim Fregosi, baseball player and manager
Carl Furillo, baseball player

G

Gary Gaetti, baseball player
John Gagliardi, college football coach
Chip Ganassi, racecar driver
Joe Garagiola, baseball catcher
Eleanor Garatti-Seville, swimmer
Arturo Gatti, boxer
Frankie Genaro, boxer
Eddie Giacomin, hockey player
A. Bartlett Giamatti, MLB commissioner
Joey Giardello, boxer
Joe Girardi, baseball player/manager
Margaret Gisolo, child baseball player
Andy Granatelli, CEO of STP
Cammi Granato, women's hockey player
Rocky Graziano, boxer

H

Franco Harris, football player
Ted Hendricks, football player
Pete Herman, boxer
Kelly Amonte Hiller, lacrosse player and coach

I

Agnes Iori-Robertson, basketball player
Tom Izzo, basketball coach

J

Harry Jeffra, boxer

L

Fidel La Barba, boxer
Daryle Lamonica, football player
Lou Lamoriello, hockey executive
Jake LaMotta, boxer
Tony La Russa, Major League baseball player and Manager
Tommy Lasorda, Major League baseball player and manager
Hank Lauricella, college football player
Dante Lavelli, football player
Tony Lazzeri, Major League baseball player
Jean Lenti-Ponsetto, college sports executive 
Frank Lentine, softball player
Marty Liquori, track athlete
Lou Little, football player
Ernie Lombardi, Major League baseball player
Vince Lombardi, football coach
Dr. Donna Lopiano, women sports
Larry Lucchino, Major League Baseball owner
Mike Lucci, football player
Hank Luisetti, basketball player

M

Sal Maglie, Major League baseball player
Paulie Malignaggi, boxer
Lenny Mancini, boxer
Ray Mancini, boxer
Gus Mancuso, Major League baseball player
Sammy Mandell, boxer
Mike Manganello, jockey
Greg Mannino, Paralympic skier
Gino Marchetti, football player
Rocky Marciano, boxer
Ed Marinaro, football player
Dan Marino, football player
Hank Marino, bowler
John Mariucci, hockey player
Penny Marshall, film director
Billy Martin, Major League baseball player
Art Martori, wrestling executive
Rollie Massimino, basketball coach
Linda Mastandrea, Paralympic athlete
Joey Maxim, boxer
Phil Mickelson, golfer
Mike Modano, hockey player
Joe Montana, football player
Willie Mosconi, billiard player
George Musso, football player
Johnny Musso, football player

N

Vince Naimoli, business man
Maude Nelson, baseball player
Leo Nomellini, football player
Susan Notorangelo, bike racer

O

Eddie Olczyk, hockey player

P

Mary Lou Palermo, roller derby
Steve Palermo, baseball umpire
John Panelli, football player
Babe Parilli, football player
Dan Pastorini, football player
Joe Paterno, football coach
Generoso Pavese, fencer
Vinny Pazienza, boxer
Vincent Pazzetti, football player
Stefano Pelinga, billiards player
Willie Pep, boxer
Joe Pepitone, baseball player
Cavino Michelli Petillo, racing driver
Johnny Petraglia, bowler
Joe Petrali, motorcycle racer
Rico Petrocelli, baseball player
Harry Pezzullo, golf player
Mike Piazza, baseball player
Brian Piccolo, football player
Ralph "Babe" Pinelli, baseball player
Gene Pingatore, basketball coach
Scott Pioli, football executive
Tom Pistone, racecar driver
Rick Pitino, basketball coach
Angelo Pizzo, screenwriter
Angelo Poffo, wrestler

R

Vic Raschi, baseball player
Mark Recchi, hockey player
Lindy Remigino, track athlete
Mary Lou Retton, gymnastics
Dave Righetti, baseball player and coach
Phil Rizzuto, baseball player
Andy Robustelli, football player
Robin Romeo, bowler
Nat Rosasco, golfer
Richard Ruffalo, Paralympic athlete
Angela Ruggiero, hockey player

S

Tony Sacco, sports official
Alicia Sacramone, gymnast
Joan Salvato Wulff, fly fisher
Carmen Salvino, bowler
Bruno Sammartino, wrestler
Ron Santo, baseball player
Joey Saputo, soccer executive
Gene Sarazen, golfer
Randy Savage, wrestler
Mike Scioscia, baseball manager
Ralph Serpico, college football player
Jimmy Smith, bowler
John Smith, wrestler
John Smoltz baseball player

T

Paul Tagliabue, football executive
Mario "Motts" Tonelli, football player
Joe Torre, baseball player
Gino Torretta, football player
Mario Trafeli, speed skater
Charley Trippi, football player

V

Sonny Vaccaro, basketball scout
Bobby Valentine, baseball manager
Jim Valvano, basketball coach
Andy Varipapa, bowler
Ken Venturi, golfer
The Venturini Family, racecar drivers
Dick Vermeil, football coach
Phil Villapiano, football player
Frank Viola, baseball player
Dick Vitale, sports announcer

W

Johnny Wilson, boxer

Y

Lewa Yacilla, softball player
Denise DeBartolo York, football owner

Z

Frank Zamboni, inventor
Louis Zamperini, runner and Olympic athlete
Barry Zito, baseball player

References

Lists of American sportspeople
Sports Hall of Fame
American people of Italian descent